WTGA-FM (101.1 FM) is a radio station broadcasting a classic hits format. Licensed to Thomaston, Georgia, United States.  The station is currently owned by Radio Georgia, Inc.

History
The station went on the air as WTZQ on 1982-08-09.  on 1983-05-09, the station changed its call sign to the current WTGA .

References

External links

TGA-FM